CJ KIFT Co, Ltd. (hangul:씨제이한국복합물류, Shijei Hanguk Bokhap Mulryu) is a South Korean logistics and shipping company. headquartered in Bugok-dong Gunpo Gyeonggi-do and Taepyeong-Ro Jung-gu Seoul, South Korea. established in 1998. it was a local, worldwide in llogistic, freight and express service products. Logistic center is based in Seoul and other Korea local. and group family by CJ Group. The "CJ KIFT" CEO is Kim Jong Ho (김종호). The company is commonly referred to as "CJ KIFT" (Spelling your Cheil Jedang's Korea Integrated Freight Terminal).

Business products
LSP Product
LRP Product
Insourcing Product

See also
Economy of South Korea
CJ Group

External links
CJ KIFT Homepage (in Korean)

CJ Group
Logistics companies of South Korea
Transport companies established in 1998